The Ekoid languages are a dialect cluster of Southern Bantoid languages spoken principally in southeastern Nigeria and in adjacent regions of Cameroon. They have long been associated with the Bantu languages, without their status being precisely defined. Crabb (1969) remains the major monograph on these languages, although regrettably, Part II, which was to contain grammatical analyses, was never published. Crabb also reviews the literature on Ekoid up to the date of publication.

The nearby Mbe language is the closest relative of Ekoid and forms with it the Ekoid–Mbe branch of Southern Bantoid.

Languages
Ethnologue lists the following Ekoid varieties with the status of independent languages. Branching is from Watters (1978) and Yoder et al. (2009).

Ndoe
(core)
Ejagham (Ekoi)
Efutop–Ekajuk: Efutop, Nde-Nsele-Nta, Abanyom, Nkem-Nkum, Ekajuk–Nnam

Names and locations (Nigeria)
Below is a list of language names, populations, and locations (in Nigeria only) from Blench (2019).

Phonology
Proto-Ekoid is reconstructed with the following vowels and tones: ; high, low, rising, falling, and downstep. The rising and falling tones, though, might be composite.

It is thought to have the following consonants:

Study
The first publication of Ekoid material is in Clarke (1848) where five ‘dialects’ are listed and a short wordlist of each is given. Other major early publications are Koelle (1854), Thomas (1914) and Johnston (1919–1922). Although Koelle lumped his specimens in the same area, it seems that Cust (1883) was the first to link them together and place them in a group co-ordinate  with Bantu but not within it. Thomas (1927) is the first author to make a correct classification of Ekoid Bantu, but oddly the much later Westermann & Bryan (1952) repeats an older, inaccurate classification. This also propagated another old error and included the Nyang languages with Ekoid. Nyang languages have their own quite distinct characteristics and are probably further from Bantu than Ekoid.

Guthrie (1967–1971) could not accept that Ekoid formed part of Bantu. His first improbable explanation was that its ‘Bantuisms’ resulted from speakers of a Bantu language being ‘absorbed’ by those who spoke a ‘Western Sudanic’ language, in other words, the apparent parallels, were simply a massive block of loanwords. This was later modified into ‘Ekoid languages may to some extent share an origin with some of the A zone languages, but they seem to have undergone considerable perturbations’ (Guthrie 1971, II:15). Williamson (1971) in an influential classification of Benue–Congo assigned Ekoid to ‘Wide Bantu’ or what would now be called Bantoid, a rather untidy mass of languages lying somehow between Bantu and the remainder of Benue–Congo.

All modern classifications of Ekoid are based on Crabb (1969) and when Watters (1981) came to explore the proto-phonology of Ekoid, he used this source, rather than his own field material from the Ejagham dialects in Cameroon. A problematic aspect of Crabb is his notation of Ekoid which does not clearly distinguish phonetic from phonemic transcription. Fresh work on Ejagham by Watters (1980, 1981) has extended our knowledge of the Cameroonian dialects of Ekoid. However, an important unpublished dissertation by Asinya (1987) based in fresh fieldwork in Nigeria made an important claim about Ekoid phonology, namely that most Ekoid languages have long/short distinctions in the vowels. Ekoid has raised particular interest among Bantuists because it has a noun-class system that seems close to Bantu and yet it cannot be said to correspond exactly (Watters 1980).

See also
Ekoid word lists (Wiktionary)

References

External links
 Roger Blench, 'Ekoid'
 Ekoid basic lexicon at the Global Lexicostatistical Database

 
Languages of Cameroon
Languages of Nigeria
Southern Bantoid languages